The United Nations Buffer Zone in Cyprus is a demilitarized zone, patrolled by the United Nations Peacekeeping Force in Cyprus (UNFICYP), that was established in 1964 and extended in 1974 after the ceasefire of 16 August 1974, following the Turkish invasion of Cyprus, and the de facto partition of the island into the area controlled by the Republic of Cyprus (excluding the British Sovereign Base Areas) and the largely unrecognized Turkish Republic of Northern Cyprus in the north.

The dividing line is also referred to as the Attila Line, named after Turkey's 1974 military intervention, codenamed Operation Attila. The Turkish army has built a barrier on the zone's northern side, consisting mainly of barbed-wire fencing, concrete wall segments, watchtowers, anti-tank ditches, and minefields. The zone cuts through the centre of Nicosia, separating the city into southern and northern sections. After the fall of the Berlin Wall in 1989, Nicosia remains the last divided capital in Europe. Some 10,000 people live in several villages and work on farms located within the zone; the village of Pyla is famous for being one of the few remaining villages in Cyprus where Greek and Turkish Cypriots still live side by side. Other villages are Deneia, Athienou, and Troulloi. Some areas are untouched by human interference and have remained a safe haven for flora and fauna.

History

A buffer zone in Cyprus was first established in the last days of 1963, when Major-General Peter Young was the commander of the British Joint Force (later known as the Truce Force and a predecessor of the present UN force). This Force was set up in the wake of the inter-communal violence of Christmas 1963. On 30 December 1963, following a ‘high powered’ twelve hour meeting chaired by Duncan Sandys (British Secretary of State for Commonwealth Relations), General Young drew the agreed cease-fire line on a map with a green chinagraph pencil, which was to become known as the "Green Line". Brigadier Patrick Thursby also assisted in devising and establishing the Green Line.

This map was then passed to General Young's intelligence officer, who was waiting in a nearby building and told to "Get on with it." Intelligence Corps NCOs then copied the map for distribution to the Truce Force units. Further copies of the map would then have been produced ‘in house’ for use by Truce Force patrols.

The Green Line became impassable following the July 1974 Turkish invasion of Cyprus during which Turkey occupied approximately 37% of Cypriot territory, in response to a short-lived Greek Cypriot coup. A "security zone" was established after the Tripartite Conference of Geneva in July 1974. Pursuant to United Nations Security Council Resolution 353 of 1974, the foreign ministers of Greece, Turkey, and the United Kingdom convened in Geneva on 25 July 1974. According to UNFICYP, the text of the joint declaration transmitted to the Secretary-General of the United Nations was as follows:

The UN Security Council then adopted the above declaration with Resolution 355. When the coup dissolved, the Turkish Armed Forces advanced to capture approximately 37% of the island and met the "Green Line". The meandering Buffer Zone marks the southernmost points that the Turkish troops occupied during the Turkish Invasion of Cyprus in August 1974, running between the ceasefire lines of the Cypriot National Guard and Turkish army that de facto divides Cyprus into two, cutting through the capital of Nicosia. With the self-proclamation of the internationally unrecognized "Turkish Republic of Northern Cyprus", the Buffer Zone became its de facto southern border.

Traffic across the buffer zone was very limited until 2003, when the number of crossings and the rules governing them were relaxed.

In March 2021 Cyprus erected a barbed wire fence on the Buffer Zone to curb illegal immigration.

Sectors

Sector One
Since 16 October 1993, it has been the responsibility of the Argentinian Contingent with approximately 212 soldiers. Sector One Headquarters and Command Company are located in San Martin Camp, which is near Skouriotissa village. Support Company finds its home at Roca Camp, near Xeros in the north. The two line companies are deployed along four permanently manned patrol bases while also conducting mobile patrols from the San Martin and Roca camps.

Sector Two

Since 1993, it has been the responsibility of the British contingent, which deploys using the name Operation TOSCA.

Sector Three
Sector 3 was patrolled by Canadian troops until their departure in 1993. It was then absorbed into Sectors 2 and 4.

Sector Four

Crossings

After a nearly 30-year ban on crossings, the Turkish Cypriot administration significantly eased travel restrictions across the dividing line in April 2003, allowing Greek Cypriots to cross at the Ledra Palace Crossing just outside the walls of old Nicosia. This was only made possible after the decision of the ECHR (Djavit An vs Turkey, Application No.20652/92).

These are the crossings now available:

Before Cypriot accession to the European Union, there were restrictions on Green Line crossings by foreigners imposed by the Republic of Cyprus, but these were abolished for EU citizens by EU regulation 866/2004. Generally, citizens of any country are permitted to cross the line, including Greek and Turkish Cypriots. A 2005 EU report stated that "a systematic illegal route through the northern part to the government-controlled areas exists" allowing an influx of asylum seekers.

Incidents

On 11 August 1996, Greek Cypriots demonstrated with a march against the Turkish occupation of Cyprus. The demonstrators' demand was the complete withdrawal of Turkish troops and the return of Cypriot refugees to their homes and properties. Among the demonstrators was Cypriot refugee Tassos Isaac, who was beaten to death by the Turkish far-right group Grey Wolves.

Another man, Solomos Solomou (Tassos Isaac's cousin), was shot to death by a Northern Cyprus minister during the same protests on 14 August 1996.
Aged 26, Solomou was one of many mourners who entered the Buffer Zone three days after Isaac's funeral, on 14 August to lay a wreath on the spot where he had been beaten to death. As Solomou was climbing to a flagpole to remove the flag of Turkey, he was fired upon by Minister of Agriculture and Natural Resources of Northern Cyprus Kenan Akin. An investigation by authorities of the Republic of Cyprus followed, and the suspects were named as Kenan Akin and Erdal Haciali Emanet (Turkey-born Chief of Special Forces of Northern Cyprus). International legal proceedings were instigated and arrest warrants for both were issued via Interpol. During the demonstrations on 14 August 1996, two British soldiers were also shot at and wounded by the Turkish forces: Neil Emery and Jeffrey Hudson, both from 39th Regiment Royal Artillery. Bombardier Emery was shot in his arm, whilst Gunner Hudson was shot in the leg by a high velocity rifle round and was airlifted to hospital in Nicosia, then on to RAF Akrotiri.

Activism
The buffer zone between the checkpoints that divide Ledra Street was used as a space for activism from 15 October 2011 up until June 2012 by the Occupy Buffer Zone movement.

See also

Cyprus conflict
Cypriot refugees
Republic of Cyprus
United Nations High Commissioner for Refugees Representation in Cyprus
List of territories governed by the United Nations
Sovereign Base Areas Customs
Pyla
Louroujina Salient
Kokkina exclave

References

External links 

 UNFICYP website 
 Forgotten Architecture in the United Nations Buffer Zone Cyprus Adrian Scarbrough Photography

United Nations operations in Cyprus
Separation barriers
Demilitarized zones
1974 establishments in Cyprus
7 Most Endangered Programme
International borders